Agnidra vinacea is a moth in the family Drepanidae. It was described by Frederic Moore in 1879. It is found in Sikkim, north-eastern India and north-eastern Myanmar.

The wingspan is 17.5–21 mm for males and 19.5–23.5 mm for females. Adults are similar to Agnidra fuscilinea.

References

Moths described in 1879
Drepaninae
Moths of Asia